

Nineteenth century

Zahari Zograf (1810–1853)church mural paintings and icons 
Stanislav Dospevski (1823–1878)painter
Ivan Mrkvicka (1856–1938)genre composition
Jaroslav Vesin (1860–1915)genre composition

Twentieth century

Vladimir Dimitrov - Maistora (1882–1960)painter
Pascin (Julius Mordecai Pincas) (1885–1935)expressionist
Sultana Suruzhon (1900–1960)modernist painting
Kyril Vassilev (1908–1987)portraits

Twentieth century (post World War II)

Keratza Vissulceva (1911–2004)oil on canvas
Violeta Maslarova (1925–2006)painting
Daria Vassilyanska (1928-2017)painting
Christo Javacheff (1935-2020)installation art
Radi Nedelchev (born 1938)naive/folk art
Georgi Janakiev (1941-2018)graffics/painting
Ivan Minekov (born 1947)sculpture
Atanas Hranov (born 1961)painting, sculpture
Alexander Telalim (born 1966)painting, watercolor
Nadezhda Koutevapainting

Twenty-first century
Svetlana Mircheva (born 1976)contemporary artist, media art
Boryana Rossa (born 1972)performance art, video and photography
Yanko Tihov (born 1977)painting

See also
Process-Space Festival (Bulgaria)
Art genre

Bulgarian artists and artistic movements
Bulgarian artists
ArtistsI